Rashid Hossain Choudhury (1 April 1932 – 12 December 1985) was a Bangladeshi second generation artist, sculptor, writer and professor.  He played a major part in the art movements and improvement in the art-related educational institutions of Bangladesh. He has received numerous awards and recognition for creative contribution and innovative influence. During the 1950s, he had been a significant pioneer in the modern art movement in Bandladesh.

Choudhury received education in fine arts in Madrid and Paris. As such, a western influence can be seen in his uniquely Bengali work. Beside Art Movements, he made particular contribution in fine arts education in Bangladesh, founding the Chittagong Art College.

His works can be seen displayed across the world, by both public and private institutions.

Family, early life and education 
Choudhury was born on 1 April 1932, at Haroa, Faridpur District (now under Rajbari district). He was born to a family of zamindars, of the Ratandiya village. His father's name was Khan Bahadur Yusuf Hossain Choudhury and his mother's name was Shirin Nessa Choudhurani. He had nine brothers and four sisters. His uncle Khan Bahadur Alimuzzaman Choudhury was the board president of Faridpur district during that time. The Alimuzzaman Bridge, in Faridpur is named after his uncle. His father and brother were both members of parliament in Bangladesh.

His education started in a primary school of his village. Later he studied in Rajanikanto High School, Alimunzzaman High School and Park Circus School in Kolkata. He sat foir his matriculation examination in 1949. He had a common friend with Zainul Abedin and Quamrul Hassan, whose suggested that he enroll in Art College, which is now known as Institute of Fine Arts, University of Dhaka. He graduated the BFA examination in 1954 with first class. He traveled to Madrid and later Paris, to study fine arts. 

During his studies in Paris, he met and fell in love with a  fellow student, Annie Grangier. They married in Paris in 1963 and had twin daughters: Shirin and Therese, named after their two grandmothers.  In 1965, they traveled to Bangladesh, where Choudhury did the bulk of his most recognized artistic work.

Legacy 
In the Indian subcontinent, he was prominent as a tapestry artist, for which he is best known. Besides tapestry art, he also worked on oil painting, tempera, water painting and various other media. At home and abroad, he worked on many tapestry pieces for both governmental and private clients. For outstanding contribution in the tapestry industry, he was awarded the Ekushey Padak in 1977 which was then the highest civilian award in Bangladesh. He was also awarded the Bangladesh Shilpakala Academy Award in 1980.

His Tapestry has recently been on display at the Metropolitan Museum of Art New York City.

See also 
 List of Bangladeshi painters

References

Further reading 
Bibliography
English
 
 
 

Bengali
 
 
 
 
 

Journals

External links 

 
 Rashid Choudhury (1932–1986) – Finearts Chittagong
 Art works of Rashid Chowdhury – Athena Gallery of Finearts

1932 births
1986 deaths
20th-century Bangladeshi painters
20th-century male artists
20th-century Bangladeshi sculptors
Tapestry artists
Artist authors
Recipients of the Ekushey Padak
University of Dhaka alumni